Big Rock is an unincorporated community in Scott County, Iowa, United States. It is located at the intersection of County Road Y42E and 317th Street, in the northwest corner of Scott County, northwest of Dixon and south of Wheatland.

Demographics

History
Big Rock was founded by Peter Goddard in 1855, named after a large rock in the area.

For 113 years, one of the town's main businesses was Horstmann's General Store, a general store where area residents could purchase groceries, supplies and miscellaneous items. The store was notable for letting locals put items on a "tab", allowing community members to get grocery items without immediate pay as long as it was repaid in the future. Horstmann's was a victim of theft multiple times toward the end of its tenure, mostly having cigarettes stolen. The store closed in 2010 after its owner died. The town at one time also had a railroad station, a lumber yard, a dance hall, and a tavern, all of which also have since closed. It is home to a local cemetery, with dates of death going back to the mid-1880s and earlier.
The city used to be a shipping port for timber and wood, as well as distributed ice throughout the area via a small waterfall that was accessed in a wooded area away from the main highway that now runs through the middle of the town. This ice was brought across from the wooded area and then slid down a large hill to deliver to the town and the rail yard for distribution. Big Rock was also home to two churches, one of which was torn down in the early 2000s.

The city is the hometown of B.R.A., otherwise known as Big Rock Army, a semi-professional motor sports club run by a local family.

The town still from time to time will get together for "Big Rock days", a celebration of the local community in front of the large rock in which the town is named after.

References

Unincorporated communities in Scott County, Iowa
Unincorporated communities in Iowa
1855 establishments in Iowa
Populated places established in 1855